Albert Stephen 'Alby' Lane (21 March 1904 – 8 September 1982) was an Australian rugby league footballer who played in the 1920s.

Playing career
Born at Balmain, New South Wales in 1904, Alby Lane, often known as 'Georgie' Lane was a half-back for the Sydney University rugby league team during the 1920s. 

He played four seasons for the club between 1924-1926 and 1928, whilst studying medicine at Sydney University. He captained University in their only Grand Final appearance in 1926. 

He also represented New South Wales on eight occasions in 1925,1926 and 1928.

Post playing
Lane later ran his own Sydney medical practice.  He then moved to Canberra and became the head of the Canberra Community Hospital.

Death
Lane died in Canberra on 8 September 1982.

References

Sydney University rugby league team players
New South Wales rugby league team players
Australian rugby league players
1904 births
1982 deaths
Australian general practitioners
Sydney Medical School alumni
Rugby league halfbacks
Rugby league players from Sydney